The SIG MG 50 is a general-purpose machine gun of Swiss origin and was chambered in many calibres. It was designed to replace the Maxim and Furrer M25 guns in service of pre-World War II design so around 1944/51, SIG industries decided to manufacture a series of gas-operated machine guns fed by using drum magazines and ammo belts. The MG50 lost in the trials to the MG51; however, it continued sales for a time. A version chambered in the .30-06 calibre was adopted by Denmark as the SIG M/51, while another variant was tested in Sweden as the SIG MG53 but again was turned down.

Overview
The MG50 is an air-cooled, gas-operated weapon and is fed by ammo belt. The barrel is designed to be interchanged quickly when in field conditions.

References

General-purpose machine guns
Machine guns of Switzerland
.30-06 Springfield machine guns